Platylobium reflexum is a shrub species that is endemic to Victoria, Australia. It is a member of the family Fabaceae and of the genus Platylobium. The species was formally described in 2011. The type specimen was collected from Gembrook.

References

reflexum
Fabales of Australia
Flora of Victoria (Australia)
Plants described in 2011